Bryan Davis may refer to:

 Bryan Davis (cricketer) (born 1940), former West Indian cricketer
 Bryan Davis (author) (born 1958), American Christian fantasy author
 Bryan Davis (inventor) (born 1981), American inventor and distiller
 Bryan Davis (basketball) (born 1986), American basketball player

See also
 Brian Davis (disambiguation)